På lugnare vatten is a 1990 studio album from Kikki Danielsson & Roosarna. "Vägg i vägg" is a lyrics version in Swedish of the song "Eitt lag enn", which when performed by Stjórnin finished 4th for Iceland at the Eurovision Song Contest 1990. "Cliff medley" is a combination of Cliff Richard hits. The album also contains cover versions on artists and groups as Ted Gärdestad, ABBA and Tanita Tikaram.

Track listing

References 

1990 albums
Roosarna albums